Muhammad Saad Kandhlawi (born 10 May 1965) is an Indian Muslim scholar and preacher.  He is the great-grandson of the Tablighi Jamat founder Muhammad Ilyas Kandhlawi. He heads the Nizamuddin faction of the Tablighi Jamat.

Early life
Saad Kandhlawi was born on 10 May 1965 (1385 AH) in Western Uttar Pradesh's Kandhla town in Shamli District. He is the great-grandson of the founder of Tablighi Jamat, Muhammad Ilyas Kandhlawi through former ameer of the Tablighi Jamat Muhammad Yusuf Kandhlawi.

He completed his Dars-e-Nizami studies from Madrasa Kashiful Uloom at Nizamuddin Markaz, Nizamuddin West, South Delhi in 1987.

Career
Former head of the Tablighi Jamat Inamul Hasan Kandhlawi had formed a 10-member legislation before his death in 1995 to look after the Jamat affairs and this legislation (commonly shura) was intact until 2015. Most of the scholars in this group died during these 20 years including Zubair ul Hassan Kandhlawi. A meeting was held in Raiwind Markaz on 16 November 2015 to fill up the vacant spaces of the shura legislation and a new shura consisting of 13 members including Muhammad Abdul Wahhab was formed. Kandhlawi did not agree with this shura and declared himself as the head of Jamat.

Kandhlawi leads the Nizamuddin Markaz faction of the Jamat.

Reception
Some of Kandhlawi's statements lead the Deobandi scholars to issue fatawa against him. South African Mufti Ebrahim Desai published a fatwa on his website Askimam. The Islamic seminary of India Darul Uloom Deoband issued a fatwa against Kandhlawi, questioning his leadership.

Zaid Mazahiri of the Darul Uloom Nadwatul Ulama also wrote many treatises over this issue including Tablighi Jamat Ka Bahami Ikhtelaf awr Ittehad-o-Ittefaq awr Sulah-o-Safaii Ki ek Koshish (Internal Dispute of Tablighi Jamat: An attempt to mutually unite, and reconcile). Following these reactions, British scholar Yusuf Motala wrote and spoke in the defence of Kandhlawi.

Nizamuddin Markaz COVID-19 hotspot 

Amid the COVID-19 pandemic in India, a number of patients from Nizamuddin Markaz tested positive for coronavirus, which resulted in the Delhi Government registering an FIR against Kandhlawi for organizing a Tablighi Jamat religious event at the Markaz, despite the restriction of such gatherings after 16 March. They had also sought help from authorities for vacating the premises on 25 March. On 23 August 2021, the Delhi High court ordered the Delhi police to open Kandhlawi's house within 2 days.

Family life
Saad is son-in-law of Salman Mazahiri.

During a police raid in April 2020, it was exposed in the media that Saad owns a large farmhouse in the Shamli District of Delhi. The farmhouse's mansion is equipped with plush interiors, CCTVs, electric fence, ferocious dogs., swimming pool, luxury cars, exotic animals and exotic birds. The media also revealed that the electricity bills were being paid under his son's name, Yusuf bin Saad, further proving his ownership of the house. The property has been a tightly kept secret and is widely unknown to his followers as Saad preaches a simple lifestyle. Saad's relative, Badrul Hassan has defended Maulana Saad claiming that although he owns the mansion, he only goes there once every month.

References

1965 births
Living people
Tablighi Jamaat people
Indian Islamic religious leaders
Deobandis
People from Shamli district